Stephen Adekolu (born January 20, 1989) is a Canadian football wide receiver for the Montreal Alouettes of the Canadian Football League (CFL).

Career
He played CIS football at Bishop's University. Adekolu was signed by the BC Lions on February 27, 2014. He played with the Lions in 42 games, until he was released during the 2017 season.

In August 2017, Adekolu signed with the Montreal Alouettes. He re-signed with Montreal in February 2019. After pledging his first paycheque of 2019 towards a charity combating domestic violence, Adekolu was released once he played in his first game of the year.

In 65 career games across 6 seasons in the CFL, Adekolu has caught 4 passes for 50 yards. He has more career catches in the postseason than the regular season, with 5 catches for 48 yards coming in one game against Winnipeg in 2016.

Personal life
Adekolu was spotted by a talent agent following a playoff loss who approached him about becoming an actor; Adekolu has appeared in stage work such as Hamlet, as well as television appearances on Supernatural and Lucifer.

Adekolu is an ally to end violence against women, and pledged his first football paycheque of the 2019 season to Canadian nonprofit organization Shield of Athena Family Services.

References

External links
 Canadian Football League profile
 
 
 Bishop's Gaiters profile

Living people
1989 births
Players of Canadian football from Ontario
Canadian football wide receivers
Bishop's Gaiters football players
BC Lions players
Sportspeople from Brampton
Montreal Alouettes players